Sodium persulfate is the inorganic compound with the formula Na2S2O8.  It is the sodium salt of peroxydisulfuric acid, H2S2O8, an oxidizing agent. It is a white solid that dissolves in water.  It is almost non-hygroscopic and has good shelf-life.

Production
The salt is prepared by the electrolytic oxidation of sodium bisulfate:
2 NaHSO4 -> Na2S2O8 + H2
Oxidation is conducted at a platinum anode. In this way about 165,000 tons were produced in 2005. 

The standard redox potential of sodium persulfate into hydrogen sulfate is 2.1 V, which is higher than that of hydrogen peroxide (1.8 V) but lower than ozone (2.2 V). The sulfate radical formed in situ has a standard electrode potential of 2.7 V.

However, there are a few drawbacks in utilizing platinum anodes to produce the salts; the manufacturing process is inefficient due to oxygen evolution and the product could contain contaminants coming from platinum corrosion (mainly due to extremely oxidizing nature of the sulfate radical). Thus, boron-doped diamond electrodes have been proposed as alternatives to the conventional platinum electrodes.

Structure
The sodium and potassium salts adopt very similar structures in the solid state, according to X-ray crystallography.  In the sodium salt, the O-O distance is 1.476Å.  The sulfate groups are tetrahedral, with three short S-O distances near 1.44 and one long S-O bond at 1.64Å.

Applications
It is mainly used as a  radical initiator for emulsion polymerization reactions for styrene based polymers such as Acrylonitrile butadiene styrene.  Also applicable for accelerated curing of low formaldehyde adhesives.

Other uses
It is a bleach, both standalone (particularly in hair cosmetics) and as a detergent component. It is a replacement for ammonium persulfate in etching mixtures for zinc and printed circuit boards, and is used for pickling of copper and some other metals.

It is also used as a soil conditioner and for soil and groundwater remediation and in manufacture of dyestuffs, modification of starch, bleach activator, desizing agent for oxidative desizing, etc.

Organic chemistry
Sodium persulfate is a specialized oxidizing agent in chemistry, classically in the Elbs persulfate oxidation and the Boyland–Sims oxidation reactions. It is also used in radical reactions; for example in a synthesis of diapocynin from apocynin where iron(II) sulfate is the radical initiator.

Safety
The salt is an oxidizer and forms combustible mixtures with organic materials such as paper.

References

Persulfates
Sodium compounds
Oxidizing agents